Nicole Arendt and Ai Sugiyama were the defending champions but they competed with different partners that year, Arendt with Liezel Huber and Sugiyama with Elena Tatarkova.

Sugiyama and Tatarkova lost in the second round to Elena Dementieva and Janette Husárová.

Arendt and Huber lost in the quarterfinals to Virginia Ruano Pascual and Paola Suárez.

Lisa Raymond and Rennae Stubbs won in the final 7–5, 6–0 against Dementieva and Husárová.

Seeds
Champion seeds are indicated in bold text while text in italics indicates the round in which those seeds were eliminated.

Draw

Final

Top half

Bottom half

Qualifying

Qualifying seeds

Qualifiers
  Rika Hiraki /  Nana Miyagi

Lucky losers

Qualifying draw

External links
 Official results archive (ITF)
 Official results archive (WTA)

2002 Pacific Life Open
Pacific Life Open